One Against All is a 1927 German silent film directed by Nunzio Malasomma and starring Carlo Aldini, Hanni Reinwald and Carl Auen.

The film's art direction was by Max Heilbronner.

Cast
In alphabetical order
 Carlo Aldini
 Carl Auen
 Inge Borg
 Michael Chekhov
 Wilhelm Diegelmann
 Karl Falkenberg
Georg Georgi
 Maria Mindzenty
 Hermann Picha
 Hanni Reinwald
 Albert Steinrück
 Sylvia Torf
 Ruth Weyher

References

External links

1927 films
Films of the Weimar Republic
Films directed by Nunzio Malasomma
German silent feature films
German black-and-white films
1920s German films